This is a comprehensive listing of official releases by Spencer Krug, an indie rock musician from Canada. Spencer Krug is a singer, songwriter, and keyboardist for the indie rock band Wolf Parade, as well as Sunset Rubdown. He has also been a founding member in the bands Swan Lake, Frog Eyes, and Fifths of Seven.

Wolf Parade

Sunset Rubdown

Moonface

Swan Lake

Frog Eyes

Fifths of Seven

Krug, Spencer
Rock music discographies